Michael Slattery (1866-1960) was an Irish Gaelic footballer. His championship career with the Limerick senior team lasted three seasons from 1887 until 1889.

Slattery made his inter-county debut during the 1887 championship when the Commercials club represented Limerick in the inaugural championship. He won his sole All-Ireland medal that year as Limerick defeated Louth in the final.

Honours

Limerick
All-Ireland Senior Football Championship (1): 1887

References

1866 births
1960 deaths
Commercials (Limerick) Gaelic footballers
Limerick inter-county Gaelic footballers